Keith Langseth (born January 20, 1938) is a Democratic Farmer Labor Party politician and former member of the Minnesota Senate, representing District 9 since 1981 until 2013. Prior to his election to the Senate, he was a member of the Minnesota House of Representatives from District 9B from 1975 to 1979. He served a combined 36 years in the Legislature. His district included portions of Becker, Clay, Otter Tail, Traverse and Wilkin counties in the northwestern part of the state.

Personal life
Langseth grew up in Glyndon, where he still resides. He graduated from Glyndon High School in 1956 and began working as a dairy farmer. He continued farming throughout his tenure in the legislature. He and his wife, Lorraine, have three children: Dan, Joy and Gayle.

Political career
Langseth first became involved in the DFL as a result of his opposition to the Vietnam War. He was asked by the local DFL Party to run for the House of Representatives in 1974, later choosing to run for the Senate in 1980. He ran against and defeated an incumbent in both elections.

Langseth served as Chair of the Capital Investment Committee, a position he held since its creation in 2001. He was also a member of the Taxes, Agriculture and Veterans, Agriculture and Veterans Budget and Policy Division, Transportation, Transportation Budget and Policy Division, and Rules and Administration committees. His stated legislative concerns included bonding, tax policy, transportation, education and agriculture.

Langseth announced his retirement from politics and did not run for re-election in 2012.

Electoral history
Minnesota Senate District 9 Election 2010
Keith Langseth (D)  14,595 votes, 52.52%
Jeff Backer (R), 13,168 votes, 47.39%
Write In, 25 votes, 0.09%
Minnesota Senate District 9 Election 2006
Keith Langseth (D)  20,353 votes, 69.8%
Paul Holle (R), 8,771 votes, 30.1%
Write In, 33 votes, 0.1%
Minnesota Senate District 9 Election 2002
Keith Langseth (D)  18,587 votes, 61.22%
Bradley Monson (R), 10,144 votes, 33.41%
Dan Stewart (IP), 1,278 votes, 4.21%
Minnesota Senate District 9 Election 2000
Keith Langseth (D)  19,412 votes, 61.05%
Wallace "Wally" Nord (R), 10,946 votes, 34.43%
Minnesota Senate District 9 Election 1996
Keith Langseth (D)  17,189 votes, 58.67%
Cliff Dyrud (R), 11,235 votes, 38.35%
Minnesota Senate District 9 Election 1992
Keith Langseth (D)  18,954 votes, 59.68%
Bob Friederichs (IR), 11,587 votes, 36.48%
Minnesota Senate District 9 Election 1990
Keith Langseth (D)  13,705 votes, 61.80%
Robert Westfall (IR) 7,716 votes, 34.79%
Minnesota Senate District 9 Election 1986
Keith Langseth (D)  11,166 votes, 57.96%
David Green (IR) 8,099 votes, 42.04%
Minnesota Senate District 9 Election 1982
Keith Langseth (D)  11,733 votes, 50.62%
Phyllis Thysell (IR) 10,803 votes, 46.61%
Minnesota Senate District 9 Election 1980
Keith Langseth (D)  13,776 votes, 52.9%
D.H. (Doug) Sillers (Incumbent) (IR) 12,245 votes, 47.1%
Minnesota House District 9B Election 1978
Keith Langseth (D)  5,743 votes, 49.9%
Merlyn Valan (IR) 5,758 votes, 50.1%
Minnesota House District 9B Election 1976
 Keith Langseth (D)  8,498 votes, 62.8%
 Lee Johnson (IR) 4,664 votes, 37.2%
Minnesota House District 9B Election 1974
 Keith Langseth (D)  5,361 votes, 58.94%
 Arian Strangeland (Incumbent) (IR) 3,735 votes, 41.06%

References

External links

Minnesota Senate – Senator Keith Langseth Web Page
Minnesota Public Radio Votetracker: Senator Keith Langseth Voting Record
Project Vote Smart – Senator Keith Langseth Profile

1938 births
Living people
People from Glyndon, Minnesota
American Lutherans
American people of Norwegian descent
Farmers from Minnesota
Democratic Party Minnesota state senators
Democratic Party members of the Minnesota House of Representatives
21st-century American politicians